Dharma Devatha is a 1952 Indian film produced and directed by P. Pullaiah. The film stars Santha Kumari and Kaushik, with Mudigonda Lingamurthy, Mukkamala, Relangi, Baby Sachu and Girija in supporting roles. It was simultaneously shot in Tamil and Telugu languages.

Cast 
List adapted from the database of Film News Anandan and The Hindu.

Santha Kumari as Kathyayini
Kaushik as Soorasen
Mudigonda Lingamurthy as King Veerasena
Mukkamala as Raghunatha Varma
Relangi as Ranganna
Baby Sachu as Swarna
Girija as Vasanthi
C. V. V. Panthulu
Appa K. Duraiswami as Dharmadhikari
Vangara Venkata Subbaiah as Duvva
B. N. R. as Sanjeevi
K. S. Angamuthu
Ganapathi Bhat
Master Mohan as Gopal

Dance
Lalitha as Bijlee
Padmini as Narthaki

Production 
The film was produced by P. Pullaiah who also directed it under the banner of Ragini Films, which was owned by him. The choreography was co-performed by Pasumarthi Krishnamurthy, Lalitha and Padmini. The film was produced in Tamil and Telugu with the same title.

Soundtrack 
The music for Dharma Devatha was composed by C. R. Subburaman. All the tunes for both languages are the same.

Telugu track list
For Telugu version Gopichand wrote dialogues, lyrics were written by Samudrala Sr. and Gopalaraya Sarma.  There are 11 songs in the film, of which Santha Kumari sang one herself.

Tamil tracklist
The lyrics for the Tamil songs were penned by Thanjai N. Ramaiah Dass, who also wrote the film's dialogues with Aluri Chakrapani.

Reception 
Film historian Randor Guy noted that the film had better box office success in Telugu than in Tamil.

References

External links 

1950s multilingual films
1950s Tamil-language films
1950s Telugu-language films
1952 drama films
1952 films
Films scored by C. R. Subbaraman
Indian black-and-white films
Indian drama films
Indian multilingual films